Reumannplatz  is a station on  of the Vienna U-Bahn. It is located in the Favoriten district. It opened in 1978.

References

External links 
 

Buildings and structures in Favoriten
Railway stations opened in 1978
1978 establishments in Austria
Vienna U-Bahn stations
Railway stations in Austria opened in the 20th century